James, Jim or Jimmy Steel may refer to:

Sir James Steel (1830–1904), Lord Provost of Edinburgh
James Steel, a character from the TV series Law & Order: UK
Jim Steel (director), American director, writer and producer of adult films
Jim Steel (footballer) (born 1959), Scottish footballer

See also
James Steele (disambiguation)